Lukáš Dlouhý and Michal Mertiňák were the defending champions, but decided not to participate. Marin Draganja and
Franko Škugor won the title over Norbert Gombos and Roman Jebavý 6–4, 6–4

Seeds

  Daniele Bracciali /  Florin Mergea (quarterfinals)
  Jamie Delgado /  Mateusz Kowalczyk (first round)
  Andreas Siljeström /  Igor Zelenay (first round)
  Marin Draganja /  Franko Škugor (champions)

Draw

Draw

References
 Main Draw

Credit Agricole Friuladria Tennis Cup - Doubles
Internazionali di Tennis del Friuli Venezia Giulia
Zucchetti